Allan Rodríguez Lopez (born May 27, 2004) is an American professional soccer player who plays as a midfielder for Major League Soccer club Chicago Fire.

Club career

Chicago Fire
Born in Elkhart, Indiana, Rodríguez began his career with the Indiana Fire before joining the Chicago Fire youth academy in 2019. On March 25, 2020, he signed with the Fire first team as a homegrown player in Major League Soccer.

Forward Madison (loan) 
On July 24, 2020, Rodríguez joined USL League One club Forward Madison on loan for the remainder of the 2020 season. He made his debut for Forward Madison on August 8, starting and playing 62 minutes against the Richmond Kickers.

International career
Born in the United States to Mexican parents, Rodriguez holds a U.S. and Mexican citizenship, which makes him eligible to represent either the United States or Mexico. Rodríguez has represented the United States at the under-15s, captaining his country during the CONCACAF Boys' Under-15 Championship.

Career statistics

References

External links
 Profile at Chicago Fire

2004 births
Living people
People from Elkhart, Indiana
American soccer players
Association football midfielders
Chicago Fire FC players
Forward Madison FC players
USL League One players
Soccer players from Indiana
United States men's youth international soccer players
Homegrown Players (MLS)
MLS Next Pro players
Chicago Fire FC II players
American sportspeople of Mexican descent